Rhodes High School may refer to:

E. Washington Rhodes High School in Philadelphia, Pennsylvania
James Ford Rhodes High School in Cleveland, Ohio
Rhodes High School (South Africa),Western Cape